Alexander "Boots" Smith (2 April 1902 – 29 November 1963) was a Canadian ice hockey defenceman who played 11 seasons in the National Hockey League for the Ottawa Senators, Detroit Falcons, Boston Bruins and New York Americans between 1924 and 1935. He won the Stanley Cup in 1927 with Ottawa. He was born in Bootle, Liverpool, England, United Kingdom, but grew up in Ottawa, Ontario.

He was inducted into the Lisgar Collegiate Institute Athletic Wall of Fame in 2009.

Career statistics

Regular season and playoffs

See also
 List of National Hockey League players from the United Kingdom

References

External links

1902 births
1963 deaths
Boston Bruins players
Canadian ice hockey defencemen
Detroit Falcons players
English ice hockey players
Ice hockey people from Ottawa
Lisgar Collegiate Institute alumni
New York Americans players
Ottawa Senators (1917) players
Ottawa Senators (original) players
Sportspeople from Bootle
Stanley Cup champions
British emigrants to Canada
Canadian expatriate ice hockey players in the United States